Vohitranivona is a village and commune in the Brickaville district (or: Vohibinany (district)) in the Atsinanana Region, Madagascar.

It is located near on the banks of the Rongoranga river and the former Route Nationale 2.

References

Populated places in Atsinanana